Jannik Stevens (born 21 July 1992) is a German footballer who plays as a defender for SV Straelen.

Career statistics

References

External links
 
 

1992 births
Living people
German footballers
Association football defenders
2. Bundesliga players
Regionalliga players
VfL Bochum players
VfL Bochum II players
Alemannia Aachen players
SV 19 Straelen players